Sin-Iddinam (dsuen-i-din-nam) ruled the ancient Near East city-state of Larsa from 1785 BC to 1778 BC. He was the son of Nur-Adad, with
whom there may have been a short co-regency overlap.

The annals for his 7-year reign record that he campaigned against Babylon in year 4, Ibrat and Malgium in year 5, and Eshnunna in year 6.

Sin-Iddinam is also known for a prayer to God Utu, whom he describes as "Father of the black-headed ones".

Gallery

See also

Chronology of the ancient Near East
Mashkan-shapir

Notes

External links

Sin-Iddinam Year Names at CDLI

Amorite kings
18th-century BC Sumerian kings
Kings of Larsa
18th-century BC people